Dalgaon Assembly constituency is one of the 126 assembly constituencies of Assam Legislative Assembly. Dalgaon forms part of the Mangaldoi Lok Sabha constituency.

Town Details

Following are details on Dalgaon Assembly constituency-

Country: India.
 State: Assam.
 District: Darrang district.
 Lok Sabha Constituency: Mangaldoi Lok Sabha/Parliamentary constituency.
 Assembly Categorisation: Rural constituency.
 Literacy Level:64.55%.
 Eligible Electors as per 2021 General Elections: 1,97,112 Eligible Electors. Male Electors: 1,01,506 . Female Electors: 95,606 .
 Geographic Co-Ordinates:  26°32'01.0"N 92°13'21.7"E..
 Total Area Covered:  384 square kilometres.
 Area Includes: Dalgaon thana [excluding Orang (Part) mouza]; in Mangaldoi sub- division, of Darrang district of Assam.
 Inter State Border : Darrang.
 Number Of Polling Stations: Year 2011-192,Year 2016-201,Year 2021-68.

Members of Legislative Assembly

Following is the list of past members representing Dalgaon Assembly constituency in Assam Legislature-
 1957: Md. Matlebuddin, Independent.
 1962: Md. Matlebuddin, Indian National Congress.
 1967: S. Barua, Indian National Congress.
 1973: Hashimuduin Ahmed, Indian National Congress.
 1978: Anwara Taimur, Indian National Congress (I).
 1983: Anwara Taimur, Indian National Congress.
 1985: Abdul Jabbar, Independent.
 1991: Anwara Taimur, Indian National Congress.
 1996: Abdul Jabbar, Asom Gana Parishad.
 2001: Abdul Jabbar, Asom Gana Parishad.
 2006: Ilias Ali, Indian National Congress.
 2011: Ilias Ali, Indian National Congress.
 2016: Ilias Ali, Indian National Congress.
 2021: Mazibur Rahman, All India United Democratic Front

Election results

2016 result

See also
 Darrang district
 Dalgaon
 List of constituencies of Assam Legislative Assembly

References

External links 
 

Assembly constituencies of Assam
Darrang district